Gilberte Mortier (born 12 March 1907 in Paris, date of death 18 January 1991 in Vielle-Saint-Girons) was a French freestyle swimmer. Mortier competed in the 1924 Summer Olympics. In 1924, she was a member of the French relay team which finished fifth in the 4 x 100 metre freestyle relay competition. In the 400 metre freestyle event, she was eliminated in the first round.

References

External links

1907 births
Olympic swimmers of France
Swimmers at the 1924 Summer Olympics
1991 deaths
French female freestyle swimmers
20th-century French women